Metal Knight is a real-time strategy video game released in 1998, developed by Object Software Limited and published in mainland China by Object Software and in Taiwan by T-time Technology Co., Ltd. In 1999 the English version was published by Microforum in the United States and Italy. The game supports eight online players. The game sold over 300,000 copies and received high ratings from game magazines such as Popsoft and Play. It was followed by an expansion named Black Front.

References

1998 video games
Video games developed in China
Science fiction video games
Military science fiction
Multiplayer online games
Real-time strategy video games
Video games with expansion packs
Cooperative video games
Windows games
Windows-only games